Betrayer is a 2020 Czech historical television film directed by Biser A. Arichtev. It stars Marián Labuda jr. as Emanuel Moravec. It premiered on 26 April 2020 in Czech Television with second part being released on 3 May 2020. First part was viewed by 813,000 people.

Cast
 Marián Labuda jr. as Emanuel Moravec
 Dana Droppová as Jolana
 Rebeka Poláková as Pavla Moravcová
 Filip Březina as Igor Moravec
 Oskar Hes as Jurij Moravec
 Jakub Barták as Pavlík Moravec
 Jiří Hána as Rudy
 Karel Hábl as Tomáš Garrigue Masaryk
 Viktor Preiss as Edvard Beneš
 André Hennicke as Karl Hermann Frank
 Ondřej Vetchý as Jaroslav Hrbek
 Vladimír Polívka as Walter Gretzki
 Jiří Vyorálek as Jan Rys-Rozsévač
 Ondřej Malý as Antonín Pešl
 Detlef Bothe as Reinhard Heydrich

References

External links
 
 Official website

2020 television films
2020 films
2020s Czech-language films
2020s historical drama films
Czech historical films
Czech war films
Czech television films
Czech Television original films
Czech World War II films
Films released in separate parts